Northumberland, an electoral district of the Legislative Assembly in the Australian state of New South Wales was created in 1859 and abolished in 1913.


Election results

Elections in the 1910s

1910

1910 by-election

Elections in the 1900s

1907

1904

1901

Elections in the 1890s

1899 by-election

1898

1895

1894

1891

Elections in the 1880s

1889

1887

1885

1884 by-election

1882

1882 by-election

1880

1880 by-election

Elections in the 1870s

1877

1877 by-election

1874

1872

Elections in the 1860s

1869

1868 by-election

1864

1862 by-election

1860

Elections in the 1850s

1859

Notes

References

New South Wales state electoral results by district